Prince George was launched in 1830 at Bristol. In 1837 she made one voyage transporting convicts to New South Wales, and one the next year transporting settlers to South Australia. She was last listed in 1847.

Career
Prince George first appeared in Lloyd's Register (LR) in 1830. She was re-registered in London on 12 December 1833. 

Convict transport: Captain Adolphus Colton sailed from Torbay on 27 January 1837. Prince George arrived at Sydney on 8 May. She had embarked 250 male convicts, six of whom died on the voyage. 

Immigrant transport: Prince George sailed from London on 8 September 1838, bound for South Australia. She arrived at Port Adelaide on 26 December 1838. She brought 199 passengers (126 adults and 73 children).

Fate
Prince George was last listed in Lloyd's Register in 1847 with W.Tate, master, Bell & Co., owner, and trade Shields–Mediterranean.

Citations and references
Citations

References
 
 

1830 ships
Ships built in Bristol
Age of Sail merchant ships of England
Convict ships to New South Wales